Charles Leno Jr. (born October 9, 1991) is an American football offensive tackle for the Washington Commanders of the National Football League (NFL). He played college football at Boise State and was drafted by the Chicago Bears in the seventh round of the 2014 NFL Draft. Leno was a seven-year starter for the Bears, making the 2019 Pro Bowl with them, until being released in 2021 and signing with Washington.

High school career
Leno attended San Leandro High School in San Leandro, California, where he played football and basketball, earning three varsity letters in each sport. He was named first-team all-conference as an offensive tackle and second-team all-conference as a defensive end as a senior. He was considered a three-star recruit by Rivals.com.

College career
Leno attended Boise State University, where he was a member of the Boise State Broncos football team from 2009 to 2013. He started 39 consecutive games at offensive tackle for the Broncos during his career, with the final 26 at left tackle. He earned All-Mountain West Conference honors twice in his career: a second-team selection as a junior and a first-team selection as a senior.

Professional career

Chicago Bears

Leno was drafted by the Chicago Bears in the seventh round (246th overall) of the 2014 NFL Draft.

After being a backup as a rookie, Leno was named the full-time starting left tackle in Week 4 of the 2015 season.

On August 23, 2017, Leno signed a four-year, $38 million contract extension with the Bears. He was named to the Pro Bowl in 2018, and was the first Bears offensive tackle to be named since James O. Williams in 2001.

After seven seasons as the Bears starting left tackle, Leno was released on May 3, 2021 after the team selected Teven Jenkins in the second round of the 2021 NFL Draft.

Washington Football Team / Commanders
Leno signed a one-year contract with the Washington Football Team on May 15, 2021. He started all 17 games of the 2021 season and signed a three-year, $37.5 million contract extension on January 5, 2022.

Personal life
On December 16, 2018, after the Bears defeated the Green Bay Packers to win the NFC North division title, Leno proposed to his girlfriend Jennifer Roth at midfield. Leno is a father of three daughters.

References

External links

Washington Commanders bio
Boise State Broncos bio

1991 births
Living people
Boise State Broncos football players
American football offensive tackles
Chicago Bears players
National Conference Pro Bowl players
Players of American football from Oakland, California
Washington Commanders players
Washington Football Team players